Andrei Bogomolov (born 11 April 1977) is a Kazakhstani football player who plays for FC Aktobe in the Kazakhstan Premier League.

He began his career with FC Yelimay Semey, before moving to FC Zhenis Astana, FC Kairat and FC Aktobe.

Bogomolov has made five appearances for the Kazakhstan national football team.

References

External links

1977 births
Living people
Kazakhstani footballers
Kazakhstan international footballers
FC Zhenis Astana players
FC Kairat players
FC Aktobe players
Kazakhstan Premier League players
Association football midfielders